The 2013 Ironman World Championship was a long distance triathlon competition that was held on October 12, 2013 in Kailua-Kona, Hawaii. The event was won by Belgium's Frederik Van Lierde and Australia's Mirinda Carfrae. It was the 37th edition of the Ironman World Championship, which has been held annually in Hawaii since 1978. The championship is organized by the World Triathlon Corporation (WTC).

Championship results

Men

Women

Carfrae broke Chrissie Wellington's course record of 8:54:02 set in 2009. She also lowered her own marathon course record of 2:52:09 set in 2011.

Qualification
For entry into the 2013 World Championship race, amateur athletes were required to qualify through a performance at an Ironman or selected Ironman 70.3 race. Entry into the championship race could also be obtained through a random allocation lottery or through the Ironman’s charitable eBay auction. The division of athletes was divided into professional, age group, physically challenged, and hand cycle divisions.

For professional triathletes, the 2013 championship season marked the third year of a point system that determined which professional triathletes would qualify for the championship race. To qualify, points were earned by competing in WTC sanctioned Ironman and Ironman 70.3 events throughout the qualifying year. For the 2013 championship race that period is September 1, 2012 to August 31, 2013. The top 50 male and top 35 female pros in points at the end of the qualifying year qualified to race in Kona. An athlete's five highest scoring races were counted in the point totals. At least one Ironman race must have been completed and only three Ironman 70.3 races count towards an athlete's overall point total. Prior champions received an automatic entry for the Championship race for a period of five years after their last championship performance provided that they competed in at least one full-distance Ironman race during the qualifying year. Their entry did not count toward the number of available qualifying spots.

The Ironman 2013 series consisted of 27 Ironman races plus the 2012 Ironman World Championship which was itself a qualifier for the 2013 Championship.

Qualifying Ironmans

2013 Ironman Series results

Men

*Swim shortened to 1.5k due to weather conditions.

Women

*Swim shortened to 1.5k due to weather conditions.

YWC Sports purchase
In June 2013, World Triathlon Corporation purchased YWC Sports, a private company that organizes triathlons and endurance sport events in Denmark. YWC Sports was contracted by the Challenge Family, a competing brand of WTC's Ironman races, to produce the long distance triathlon races Challenge Copenhagen and Challenge Aarhus. However, Challenge Family CEO Felix Walchshöfer did not wish to have WTC produce a Challenge licensed event and therefore terminated YWC's agreement stating that the sale to WTC constituted a breach of contract. As a result, the Challenge Copenhagen race, which was scheduled to race in August 2013, was rebranded as Ironman Copenhagen and 50 qualifying spots were offered up for the 2013 Ironman World Championships. Challenge Aarhus was replaced by Ironman 70.3 Aarhus and took place in June 2014.

References

External links
Ironman website
Professional Triathlete Qualifying Rules

Ironman World Championship
Ironman
Sports competitions in Hawaii
2013 in sports in Hawaii
Triathlon competitions in the United States